Helcystogramma graphicodes is a moth in the family Gelechiidae. It was described by Edward Meyrick in 1914. It is found in South Africa.

The wingspan is 13–14 mm. The forewings are fuscous, all veins marked with clear white lines. The stigmata is black, with the discal approximated and the plical obliquely before the first discal. There are some minute black dots along the termen. The hindwings are ochreous whitish.

References

Endemic moths of South Africa
Moths described in 1914
graphicodes
Moths of Africa